The United States competed at the 1933 World Archery Championships in London, Great Britain from 31 July to 5 August 1933.

The United States entered 1 archer and competed in the men's individual events, with Donald MacKenzie winning gold.

Events

Recurve

References

World Archery Championships
1933 in American sports
1933 in archery
Archery in the United States